Shart ( Hindi : शर्त, Translation : condition) is a 1954 black-and-white film directed by B. Mitra, starring Shyama, Deepak, Shashikala, I. S. Johar in lead roles. The music was given by Hemant Kumar and lyrics were written by S.H. Bihari. The film was produced by Filmistan and is loosely based on Alfred Hitchcock's Strangers on a Train.

Cast
Shyama
Deepak
Shashikala
I.S. Johar

Soundtrack
The music of the film was composed by Hemant Kumar and lyrics were written by S.H. Bihari.

Reception
Cineplot said of the film, "Shart, to which filmgoers had been looking forward with expectations whetted by studio reports, was disappointing."

References

External links
 

1950s Hindi-language films
1954 films
Indian black-and-white films
Indian drama films
1954 drama films